Phycitodes inquinatella is a species of snout moth. It is found in most of Europe (except Ireland, Great Britain, Fennoscandia, the Baltic region, Ukraine, the Czech Republic, Slovenia, Croatia and Bulgaria), the Canary Islands, Turkey and the Palestinian Territories.

References

Moths described in 1887
Phycitini
Moths of Europe
Moths of Asia